is a town located in Gunma Prefecture, Japan. , the town had an estimated population of 1,645 and a population density of 14.35 persons per km². A footprint of Japan's first dinosaurs was discovered in former Nakasato village, now part of Kanna.

Geography
Kanna is located in the mountainous southwestern portion of Gunma Prefecture, bordered by Saitama Prefecture to the south.

Surrounding municipalities
Gunma Prefecture
 Fujioka
 Ueno
 Shimonita
 Nanmoku
Saitama Prefecture
 Chichibu
 Ogano

Climate
Kanna has a Humid continental climate (Köppen Cfa) characterized by warm summers and cold winters with heavy snowfall.  The average annual temperature in Kanna is 10.7 °C. The average annual rainfall is 1195 mm with September as the wettest month. The temperatures are highest on average in August, at around 23.7 °C, and lowest in January, at around -1.7 °C.

Demographics
Per Japanese census data, the town's population has dropped precipitously from its 1950 peak, with the remaining population having the second oldest median age in Japan after Nanmoku, Gunma (61.5% over the age or 65). The town is thus classified as a genkai shūraku.

History
During the Edo period, the area of present-day Kanna was part of the tenryō territory administered directly by the Tokugawa shogunate in Kōzuke Province.

Kamikawa village and Nakasato village were established within Minamikanra District, Gunma Prefecture on April 1, 1889 with the creation of the modern municipalities system after the Meiji Restoration. In 1896  Minamikanra District was united with Midono and Tago Districts to create Tano District. Kamikawa village was elevated to town status in 1926 and renamed Manba town. On April 1, 2003, Manba and Nakasato merged, forming the town of Kanna.

Government
Kanna has a mayor-council form of government with a directly elected mayor and a unicameral town council of 8 members. Kanna, together with the city of Fujioka and village of Ueno contributes two members to the Gunma Prefectural Assembly. In terms of national politics, the town is part of Gunma 4th district of the lower house of the Diet of Japan.

Economy
The economy of Kanna is heavily dependent on agriculture.

Education
Kanna has one public elementary school and one public middle school operated by the town government. The town has one public high school operated by the Gunma Prefectural Board of Education.

Transportation

Railway
Kanna does not have any passenger railway service.

Highway

Local attractions
 Kanna Dinosaur Center
 Sazanamiiwa (The location of the dinosaur footprint)
 Ryūshōji (A temple famed for its cherry blossoms)
 Roadside Station Manba no Sato

References

External links

Official Website 

Towns in Gunma Prefecture
Kanna, Gunma